Pterostylis brevichila, commonly known as the dwarf shell orchid, is a species of orchid endemic to the south-west of Western Australia. As with similar greenhoods, the flowering plants differ from those which are not flowering. The non-flowering plants have a rosette of leaves flat on the ground but the flowering plants have a single flower with leaves on the flowering spike. In this species, the flower is small and white with brown stripes and is similar to P. aspera but smaller in stature.

Description
Pterostylis brevichila is a terrestrial, perennial, deciduous, herb with an underground tuber and when not flowering, a rosette of small leaves. There are often large colonies of plants having only leaf rosettes and no flowers. The dorsal sepal and petals are fused, forming a hood or "galea" over the column and the dorsal sepal has a short point. The labellum is short, straight and not visible from outside the flower. Flowering occurs from July to September.

Taxonomy and naming
Pterostylis brevichila was first formally described in 2012 by David Jones and Christopher French from a specimen collected near Scaddan and the description was published in Australian Orchid Review. The species had previously been known as Pterostylis sp. 'dwarf shell'. The specific epithet (brevichila) is derived from the Latin word brevis meaning "short" and the Ancient Greek word cheilos meaning "lip" referring to the short labellum.

Distribution and habitat
The dwarf shell orchid grows in mallee woodland, often in melaleuca thickets, between Hyden and Mount Arid in the Cape Arid National Park in the Coolgardie, Esperance Plains and Mallee biogeographic regions.

Conservation
Pterostylis brevichila is listed as "not threatened" by the Government of Western Australia Department of Parks and Wildlife.

References

brevichila
Endemic orchids of Australia
Orchids of Western Australia
Plants described in 2012